Odette Ntahomvukiye (born 14 July 1994 in Cibitoke, Burundi) is a Burundian judoka. She competed at the 2012 Summer Olympics in the -78 kg event.

References 

1994 births
Living people
Burundian female judoka
Olympic judoka of Burundi
Judoka at the 2012 Summer Olympics
People from Cibitoke Province